Mohammed Sabeel (Arabic:محمد سبيل) (born 13 April 1993) is an Emirati footballer. He currently plays as a defender for AL-Wasl.

References

External links
 

Emirati footballers
1993 births
Living people
Al-Nasr SC (Dubai) players
Al Ahli Club (Dubai) players
Shabab Al-Ahli Club players
Al-Wasl F.C. players
Place of birth missing (living people)
UAE Pro League players
Association football defenders